Yinmabin Township  is a township in Yinmabin District in the Sagaing Division of Myanmar. The principal town is Yinmabin.

Notably, 10 kilometers (6.2 mi) southeast of Yinmabin, is the Phowintaung Buddhist cave complex.

References

External links
Maplandia World Gazetteer - map showing the township boundary

Townships of Sagaing Region